The Hölty Prize (German: Hölty-Preis), established in 2007, is a lifetime achievement award given every two years to honor a German-language poet. The full name of the prize is the Hölty-Preis für Lyrik der Landeshauptstadt und der Sparkasse Hannover (Hölty Poetry Prize of the State Capital and the Savings Bank of Hanover). With a purse of €20,000, it is one of the most generous literary prizes in Germany. The prize is named for Ludwig Christoph Heinrich Hölty (1748–1776), a German poet closely associated with the region of Hanover.

Recipients 
2008: Thomas Rosenlöcher
2010: Paulus Böhmer
2012: Christian Lehnert
2014: Silke Scheuermann
2016: Christoph Meckel
2018: Norbert Hummelt
2020: Marion Poschmann
2022: Ulrich Koch

References

German literary awards
Poetry awards
Awards established in 2007